Orthopaedic Nursing  is the bimonthly peer-reviewed nursing journal of orthopaedic nursing. It is published by Lippincott Williams & Wilkins. It contains information on current events, organizational activities, research, product and drug information, and literature findings. Articles focus on professional development and clinical, administrative, academic, and research areas of orthopaedics. The journal also provides continuing education content and is the official journal of the National Association of Orthopaedic Nurses.

According to the Journal Citation Reports, the journal has a 2016 impact factor of 0.375.

See also
 Journal of Orthopaedic Nursing
 List of nursing journals

References

External links
 
 National Association of Orthopaedic Nurses

Orthopedic nursing journals
English-language journals
Lippincott Williams & Wilkins academic journals
Bimonthly journals
Publications established in 1982
1982 establishments in the United States